Nikolaos "Nikos" Papanikolopoulos (Greek: Νικόλαος "Νίκος" Παπανικολόπουλος; born April 21, 1979) is a retired Greek professional basketball player and current basketball coach. During his playing career, at a height of 1.96 m (6'5") tall, he played at the point guard and shooting guard positions.

Professional career
During his professional playing career, Papanikolopoulos played with the following clubs: Near East, AEK Athens, Aris, Ionikos NF, Olympiacos, Gymnastikos S. Larissas, AEL, Teramo, Kolossos, Peristeri, Iraklis, Ilysiakos, Panelefsiniakos, and Ikaros Chalkidas.

During his playing career, he won the Greek 2nd Division championship in 1998, and the Greek Cup title and the European-wide secondary level FIBA Saporta Cup championship in the 1999–2000 season.

National team career
Papanikolopoulos played with Greece's under-26 national team at the 2005 Mediterranean Games. He also played with the senior men's Greek national basketball team.

Coaching career
Papanikolopoulos served as an assistant coach at Koroivos Amaliadas, in the Greek Basket League, from 2014 until 2016, before he was appointed as the head coach of the team in May 2016. He became the head coach of Peristeri in 2019.

References

External links
Euroleague.net Profile
Eurobasket.com Profile
Draftexpress.com Profile
Greek League Profile 
Hellenic Federation Profile 
Italian League Profile 
AEK Athens Profile

Living people
1979 births
AEK B.C. players
A.E.L. 1964 B.C. players
Aris B.C. players
ASK Karditsas B.C. coaches
Competitors at the 2005 Mediterranean Games
Greek basketball coaches
Greek Basket League players
Greek men's basketball players
Gymnastikos S. Larissas B.C. players
Ikaros B.C. players
Ilysiakos B.C. players
Ionikos N.F. B.C. players
Iraklis Thessaloniki B.C. players
Kolossos Rodou B.C. players
Larisa B.C. coaches
Mediterranean Games medalists in basketball
Mediterranean Games silver medalists for Greece
Near East B.C. players
Olympiacos B.C. players
Panelefsiniakos B.C. players
Peristeri B.C. coaches
Peristeri B.C. players
Point guards
Shooting guards
Teramo Basket players
Sportspeople from Kalamata